The Hoene-Werle House, which is located in the Manchester neighborhood of Pittsburgh, Pennsylvania, was built in 1887 as a double house with a courtyard in the rear and a complex molded brick and millwork cornice in the front.

It was listed on the National Register of Historic Places in 1984. It is also part of the Manchester Historic District

History and architectural features
German immigrants Herman H. Hoene, who owned a retail piano store, and Fred H. Werle, a druggist, originally owned the house.

The house was abandoned then acquired by the city in the 1970s and then bought in the 1980s and restored. 

The Hoene-Werle House was listed on the National Register of Historic Places in 1984. It is also part of the Manchester Historic District

See also
Emmanuel Episcopal Church (Pittsburgh, Pennsylvania) - church designed by Henry Hobson Richardson located two blocks south on Allegheny Avenue.

References

Houses on the National Register of Historic Places in Pennsylvania
Houses in Pittsburgh
Houses completed in 1887
National Register of Historic Places in Pittsburgh